Gerti Daub Hollmann (née Daub; born 1937) is a German former model who was crowned Miss Germany 1957. Having previously been crowned Miss Hamburg 1957, she went on to represent Germany at Miss Europe 1957 and Miss Universe 1957, where she placed as the second and fourth runner-up respectively.

Life and career
Daub was born in Utrecht and raised in Germany. She was selected as Miss Hamburg 1957.

As Miss Hamburg, Daub competed in Miss Germany 1957 in Baden-Baden. She went on to win the competition, and received the right to represent Germany at both Miss Europe 1957 and Miss Universe 1957. Just days after winning the German title, Daub competed in Miss Europe in Baden-Baden, where she placed as the second runner-up. The following month, she went to Long Beach, California to compete in Miss Universe, where she placed as the fourth runner-up. At both competitions, she also won the special award of Miss Photogenic.

Personal life 
Daub married German television presenter Carlheinz Hollmann in 1958, after having met during an interview with Norddeutscher Rundfunk (NDR) earlier that year. Daub and Hollmann had two children together. Since 1965, Daub has resided in the village of Luhmühlen within the small municipality of Salzhausen in Lüneburg Heath. Hollmann died in 2004.

References

External links
 Gerti Daub Hollmann's website
 

1937 births
German beauty pageant winners
German female models
German expatriates in the Netherlands
Living people
Miss Universe 1957 contestants
People from Hamburg